The Galway Advertiser is a free newspaper distributed throughout Galway city and county each Thursday. It was the first of the regional newspapers under the "Advertiser" banner, which now also includes publications based in Athlone and Mayo, as well as advertiser.ie.

References

External links

Advertiser
Newspapers published in the Republic of Ireland
Weekly newspapers published in Ireland